Myxobolus is a genus of myxozoa that includes important parasites of fish like Myxobolus cerebralis. The genus is polyphyletic, with members scattered throughout the myxozoa. Some stages of Myxobolus species were previously thought to be different organisms entirely, but are now united in this group.

Species
Source: World Register of Marine Species

 Myxobolus acanthogobii Hoshina, 1952
 Myxobolus acanthopagri Lom & Dyková, 1994
 Myxobolus achmerovi Shulman, 1966
 Myxobolus acutus (Fujita, 1912)
 Myxobolus adeli Yurakhno & Ovcharenko, 2014
 Myxobolus aeglefini Auerbach, 1906
 Myxobolus aisanensis Chen in Chen & Ma, 1998
 Myxobolus aldrichetti Su & White, 1994
 Myxobolus algonquinensis Xiao & Desser, 1997
Myxobolus aligarhensis Bhatt & Siddiqui, 1964
 Myxobolus anatolicus Pekmezci, Yardimci, Yilmaz & Polat, 2014
 Myxobolus arabicus Kardousha & El-Tantawy, 2002
 Myxobolus asymmetricus (Parisi, 1912)
Myxobolus aureatus Ward, 1919
 Myxobolus balantiocheili Levsen, Alvik & Grotmol, 2004
 Myxobolus bartoni Kalavati, Brickle & MacKenzie, 2000
 Myxobolus baskai Molnár, Székely, Mohamed & Shaharom-Harrison, 2006
 Myxobolus bilineatum Bond, 1938
 Myxobolus bizerti Bahri & Marques, 1996
 Myxobolus branchialis (Markewitsch, 1932)
 Myxobolus braziliensis Casal, Matos & Azevedo, 1996
 Myxobolus cephalus Iverson, Chitty & Van Meter, 1971
 Myxobolus chengkiangensis Ma, 1998
 Myxobolus cheni Shulman, 1962
 Myxobolus chiungchowensis Chen in Chen & Ma, 1998
 Myxobolus conei Lom & Dyková, 1994
 Myxobolus cultus Yokoyama, Ogawa & Wakabayashi, 1995
 Myxobolus cuneus Adriano, Arana & Cordeiro, 2006
 Myxobolus cyprinicola Reuss, 1906
 Myxobolus diagrammae Kpatcha, Diebakate, Faye & Toguebaye, 1995
 Myxobolus diaphanus Fantham, Porter & Richardson, 1940
 Myxobolus episquamalis Egusa, Maeno & Sorimachi, 1990
 Myxobolus etropli Rajendran, Vijayan & Alavandi, 1998
 Myxobolus exiguus Thélohan, 1895
 Myxobolus ganguli Sarkar, Haldar & Chakraborti, 1982
 Myxobolus gayerae Molnar, Marton, Eszterbauer & Szekely, 2007
 Myxobolus ginbuna Kato, Kasai, Tomochi, Li & Sato, 2017
 Myxobolus girellae Lom & Dyková, 1994
 Myxobolus gobii Naidenova, 1975
 Myxobolus goensis Eiras & D'Souza, 2004
 Myxobolus goreensis Fall, Kpatcha, Diebakate, Faye & Toguebaye, 1997
 Myxobolus grandiintercapsularis Shulman, 1962
 Myxobolus hani Faye, Kpatcha, Diebakate, Fall & Toguebaye, 1999
 Myxobolus hannensis Fall, Kpatcha, Diebakate, Faye & Toguebaye, 1997
 Myxobolus hudsonis (Bond, 1938)
 Myxobolus hypseleotris Chen in Chen & Ma, 1998
 Myxobolus ichkeulensis Bahri & Marques, 1996
 Myxobolus improvisus Izyumova in Shulman, 1966
 Myxobolus inflatus Chen in Chen & Ma, 1998
 Myxobolus insidiosus Wyatt & Pratt, 1963
 Myxobolus klamathellus Atkinson & Banner, 2016
 Myxobolus lalithakumarii Gunter & Adlard, 2010
 Myxobolus lintoni Gurley, 1893
 Myxobolus longi Eiras, Molnar & Lu, 2005
 Myxobolus macropodusi (Chen in Chen & Ma, 1998)
 Myxobolus mahendrae Sarkar, 1986
 Myxobolus merlucii (Perugia, 1891)
 Myxobolus mexicanus Yoshino & Noble, 1973
 Myxobolus monopterus (Chen in Chen & Ma, 1998)
 Myxobolus muelleri Bütschli, 1882
 Myxobolus mugauratus Landsberg & Lom, 1991
 Myxobolus mugcephalus (Narasimhamurti, 1980)
 Myxobolus mugchelo Landsberg & Lom, 1991
 Myxobolus mugilis (Perugia, 1891)
 Myxobolus mystusius Sarkar, 1986
 Myxobolus narasii (Narasimhamurti, 1970)
 Myxobolus neurophilus (Guilford, 1963)
 Myxobolus nile Eiras, Molnar & Lu, 2005
 Myxobolus ophicephali Bhatt & Siddiqui, 1964
 Myxobolus pangasii Molnár, Székely, Mohamed & Shaharom-Harrison, 2006
 Myxobolus paratoyamai Kato, Kasai, Tomochi, Li & Sato, 2017
 Myxobolus parenzani Landsberg & Lom, 1991
 Myxobolus parvus Shulman, 1962
 Myxobolus percae Fantham, Porter & Richardson, 1939
 Myxobolus perforata Ali, Al-Rasheid, Sakran, Abdel-Baki & Abdel-Ghaffar, 2002
 Myxobolus petenensis Frey, Cone & Duobinis-Gray, 1998
 Myxobolus petruschewskii Zhukov, 1964
 Myxobolus pleuronectidae Hahn, 1917
 Myxobolus purkynjei Lom & Dyková, 1994
 Myxobolus raibauti Fall, Kpatcha, Diebakate, Faye & Toguebaye, 1997
 Myxobolus rhinogobii Chen in Chen & Ma, 1998
 Myxobolus rhodei Lom & Dyková, 1994
 Myxobolus saranai (Tripathi, 1953)
 Myxobolus scleroperca (Guilford, 1963)
 Myxobolus shekel 
 Myxobolus spinacurvatura Maeno, Sorimachi, Ogawa & Egusa, 1990
 Myxobolus spirosulcatus Maeno, Sorimachi, Ogawa & Kearn, 1995
 Myxobolus stomum Ali, Abdel-Baki, Sakran, Entzeroth & Abdel-Ghaffar, 2003
 Myxobolus subtecalis (Bond, 1938)
 Myxobolus tanakai Kato, Kasai, Tomochi, Li & Sato, 2017
 Myxobolus tapajosi Zatti, Atkinson, Maia, Correa, Bartholomew & Adriano, 2018
 Myxobolus tripterygii (Laird, 1953)
 Myxobolus vanivilasae Seenappa & Manohar, 1980

References

Cnidarian genera
Myxobolidae